Waaberi, was a Somali musical supergroup.

History
The troupe was established by members of the Radio Artists Association. It was supported by the Somali government as part of the National Theatre of Somalia, and made tours throughout several countries in Africa, including Egypt and Sudan. They also performed in the People's Republic of China. After a coup in 1969, the ensemble was renamed Waaberi, which means "Dawn Players". The group continued to exist as a private organization into the 1990s.

Vocalist Maryam Mursal, the first woman to play Somali jazz, was a member of the ensemble. After performing at the English WOMAD festival in 1997, the group toured North America in 1998, and recorded an album with Egyptian musician Hossam Ramzy.

See also
Music of Somalia
Radio Hargeisa
Maryam Mursal
Abdullahi Qarshe
Mohamed Mooge Liibaan
Ahmed Mooge Liibaan

References

Somalian musical groups
Supergroups (music)
Musical groups established in the 1960s
Musical groups disestablished in the 1990s
1960s establishments in Somalia
1990s disestablishments in Somalia